Introducing Save Ferris is the debut EP by Save Ferris. With the exception of "For You" and "You and Me", all tracks were re-recorded for the band's first full-length album, It Means Everything.

Track listing
All songs written by Brian Mashburn with exception for Superspy written by Mike Holton and Miré Molnar.
 "The World Is New" – 2:11
 "For You" – 2:20
 "Superspy" – 2:46 written by Mike Holton, Brian Mashburn, Miré Molnar
 "Sorry My Friend" – 3:12
 "Spam" – 2:23
 "You and Me" – 2:29
 "Under 21" – 2:40

Personnel
 Monique Powell – Vocals, Keyboards 
 Bill Uechi – Bass 
 Eric Zamora – Alto & Tenor Saxophone 
 Brian Mashburn – Guitar, Vocals 
 T-Bone Willy – Trombone 
 José Castellaños – Trumpet 
 Marc Harismendy – Drums

References

Save Ferris albums
1996 debut EPs
Epic Records EPs
Ska punk EPs